Hakan Keleş (born 8 January 1972) is a Turkish football manager and former player who is currently the manager of Giresunspor.

Managerial career
On 19 November 2018, was briefly named the manager of Sivasspor after a stint as their assistant manager. On 10 August 2020, he was named the manager of TFF First League club Giresunspor, signing a 2+1 year contract. In his first season at the club, he helped them get promoted into the Süper Lig for the first time in 44 years. His team avoided relegation in the 2021-22 season, coming in 16th place.

References

External links
 
 TFF Manager Profile
 
 Mackolik Manager Profile

1972 births
Living people
Sportspeople from Adapazarı
Turkish footballers
Turkish football managers
Dardanelspor footballers
Antalyaspor footballers
MKE Ankaragücü footballers
Kayseri Erciyesspor footballers
Bursaspor footballers
Süper Lig players
TFF First League players
Sivasspor managers
Giresunspor managers
Süper Lig managers
Association football midfielders